The Lehigh Valley is a region in Lehigh and Northampton counties of eastern Pennsylvania.

Lehigh Valley may also refer to:

Lehigh Valley AVA
Lehigh Valley College
Lehigh Valley Conference
Lehigh Valley Health Network
Lehigh Valley Hospital–Cedar Crest
Lehigh Valley International Airport
Lehigh Valley IronPigs
Lehigh Valley Mall
Lehigh Valley Outlawz
Lehigh Valley Railroad
Lehigh Valley Steam
Penn State Lehigh Valley
U.S. Route 22 in Pennsylvania, also known as the Lehigh Valley Thruway

See also